Lazola Dipha (born 17 October 1982) is a South African cricketer. He played in five first-class and five List A matches for Eastern Province from 2001 to 2006.

See also
 List of Eastern Province representative cricketers

References

External links
 

1982 births
Living people
South African cricketers
Eastern Province cricketers
Cricketers from Port Elizabeth